Coriant was incorporated as an independent company in 2013 as a spin-out from Siemens Optical Networks (NSN ON).  The launch of the company was announced for the OFC/NFOEC in March 2013 and on May 6, 2013 Coriant became independent from  Nokia Siemens Networks under the ownership of Marlin Equity Partners. 

Coriant merged with Sycamore Networks (acquired by Marlin Equity in January 2013 and headquartered in Chelmsford, Massachusetts), which continued operating as Coriant America Inc.

Marlin Equity merged Coriant and Tellabs (acquired by Marlin Equity in December 2013 Naperville, Illinois), which continued as Coriant.  Later, the telco and GPON related components of the company were spun back out as a new company, also called Tellabs.

Coriant was acquired by Infinera in 2018.

History 
Coriant originates from the Transmission Technology department of Siemens based in Munich, Germany, (Übertragungstechnik - ÜT as it was called in the 1990s). In those days the technology evolved from Plesiochronous Digital Hierarchy (PDH) to Synchronous Digital Hierarchy (SDH) in the STM-4 / STM-16 (2.5 Gbit/s) level.

In the late 1990s and early 2000s DWDM emerged to allow for even higher transmission capacity (in the terabit per second region). This technology is also named optical transport network (OTN), where a set of multiplex and encapsulation hierarchies is standardized.

References

External links 
 

Networking hardware companies
Telecommunications equipment vendors
Telecommunications companies established in 2013
Manufacturing companies established in 2013
Manufacturing companies based in Munich
Manufacturing companies based in Illinois
Companies based in Naperville, Illinois